The National Archives of Malawi is a government department in the Ministry of Information, Tourism  Culture.

History 
It was established in Zomba in July 1947 as a Regional Branch of the then Central African Archives. Later in 1953 after the formation of the Federation of Rhodesia and Nyasaland,  it became a branch of the National Archives of Rhodesia and Nyasaland. The responsibility of this branch was to be the official repository of public records as well as records belonging to private institutions and individuals who had connections with the territorial activities as well as the legal deposit library of all literature relating to the area. The Federation ended in December 1963 and in January 1964, the  Nyasaland branch became the National Archives of Malawi.

The National Archives of Malawi derives its mandate from two statutes:
 The Printed Publications Act 19:01 provides for the registration of newspapers, the printing and publication of books and the preservation of printed works in Malawi.
 the National Archives Act 28:01 which provides for the classification, conservation, custody, control, acquisition and disposal of certain public, judicial, historical and general records. .

Mission 
The mission is to collect, organise, preserve and provide access to the country's documentary heritage, irrespective of the media, for reference, research and posterity.

Functions 
 Regulate the creation, classification, maintenance, and disposal of public records.
 Provide economic storage for semi-current government records.
 Preserve and conserve archival materials (public archives, historical manuscripts, printed and published works) for reference, research, socio-economic development and  posterity.
 Collect historical manuscripts and conduct oral history research to complement official archives of the country.
 Provide a nationwide advisory service in records and archives management.
 Maintain a legal deposit library for the preservation of printed and published works on Malawi.
 Register newspapers published in Malawi as provided for under the Printed Publications Act.
 Administer the International Standard Book Numbering (ISBN) system in the country.

Sections
 Public Archives.
 Legal Deposit Library
 Training and Consultancy.
 Policy and Standards.
 Repository.
 Conservation and Preservation.

Projects
 Digitisation of Endangered Native Authority Records from 1891 - 1964.
 Digitisation of Audiovisual Collection.

See also 
 National Library Service of Malawi
 List of national archives

References 

Malawi
History of Malawi
1964 establishments in Malawi